Qeshlaq-e Esmail Khan Jalil Ranjaber (also Romanized as Qeshlāq-e Esmāʿīl Khān Jalīl Ranjaber) is a village in Qeshlaq-e Sharqi Rural District, Qeshlaq Dasht District, Bileh Savar County, Ardabil Province, Iran. At the 2006 census, its population was 21, in 4 families.

References 

Towns and villages in Bileh Savar County